Elysia viridis, the sap-sucking slug, is a small-to-medium-sized species of green sea slug, a marine opisthobranch gastropod mollusc in the family Plakobranchidae.

This sea slug resembles a nudibranch, but it is not closely related to that clade of gastropods. It is instead a sacoglossan.

Distribution
This species lives in the northeastern Atlantic, from Norway to the Mediterranean Sea as well as all around the South African coast. It is found from the intertidal zone to a depth of about 5 m.

Description
The animal grows up to 30 mm in total length. It has a smooth bright green or brown body with iridescent spots and two wing-like flaps extending along its sides. These flaps are usually folded back. The rhinophores are rolled.

Ecology
This species lives in a subcellular endosymbiotic relationship with chloroplasts derived from the alga Codium fragile.  These chloroplasts provide the Elysia host with the products of photosynthesis. Elysia viridis feeds on Codium, and absorbs its chloroplasts. The term for such an activity is kleptoplasty. The slug retains the chloroplasts within in its cells in a functioning state; they apparently are physiologically important to the host. In addition, the slugs likely rely on photosynthesis of the chloroplasts as an energy source, especially when other food sources are not available.

The egg mass is a flat greenish coil of several turns.

See also
 Elysia chlorotica
 Elysia clarki

References

External links 
 

Plakobranchidae
Gastropods described in 1804